Brigade des mœurs (French: Vice Squad) (1985) is a French B movie by Max Pécas.  It was released in the United States on DVD as Brigade of Death.

Plot
A crime ring is kidnapping women to sell them to the harems of rich Emirs, but the Vice squad put an end to it.

Cast
Thierry de Carbonnières as Gérard Lattuada
Gabrielle Forest as Sylvie
Christian Barbier as Robert Capes
Jean-Marc Maurel as Costa
Phify as Gros Louis
Pascale Roberts

External links

1985 films
1980s French-language films
French thriller films
1985 thriller films
1980s French films